The  "My Way" killings are a social phenomenon in the Philippines, referring to a number of fatal disputes which arose due to the singing of the  song "My Way", popularized by Frank Sinatra, in karaoke bars (more commonly known as "videoke" in the Philippines). A New York Times article estimated the number of killings to be about 12 as of 2022. Between 2002 and 2012, numerous people were killed for singing this song. 

Explanations for these incidents differ from the song being simply frequently sung among the nation's karaoke bars where violence is common or to perceived aggressive lyrics of the song.

Background and history
Karaoke singing is a widespread, popular pastime in the Philippines, including among those with a low income. Many were earning about $2 a day in 2007 and could purchase time on a "videoke" machine for 5 pesos (about 10 cents in US currency). Filipinos who can afford to do so often get private rooms at karaoke bars.

Since January 16, 1998, about a dozen incidents occurred in connection with strenuous complaints over the singing of the song "My Way", prompting Filipino newspapers to name the phenomenon the My Way' killings".

Attention to these killings peaked on May 29, 2007, when a 29-year-old karaoke singer was shot dead by a security guard at a bar in San Mateo, Rizal. The guard had complained that the young man's rendition of "My Way" was off-key, but the man refused to stop singing, prompting the guard to pull out a .38-caliber pistol and shoot the man dead.

Responses
Some Filipinos—even those who love the song—will not sing it in public, in order to avoid trouble or out of superstitious fear.

As of 2007, the song reportedly had been taken off the playlists of karaoke machines in many bars in Manila, after complaints about out-of-tune renditions of the song, resulting in violent fights and murders.

As a reference to the phenomenon, Japanese rock band Kishidan released an uptempo rock cover of "My Way" as their 10th anniversary single, with a promotional music video featured lead singer (Ayonocozey Show) being shot numerous times while singing the song. Ayonocozey is then shot once more in the back while walking away after the song is concluded, collapsing in a heap on the stairs. A shortened version was used as a commercial.

Explanations
New York Times writer Norimitsu Onishi argued that the killings might be "the natural byproduct of the country's culture of violence, drinking and machismo". Violent attacks occur frequently in Philippine karaoke bars, with fights often sparked over breaches of karaoke etiquette – such as laughing at other performers, performing the same song twice, or hogging the microphone. 

According to Roland B. Tolentino, an expert for pop culture at the University of the Philippines Diliman, the killings connected to singing the song in karaoke may simply reflect its popularity in a violent environment. He also noted that the song's "triumphalist" theme might have an aggravating effect on singers and listeners alike. Other tunes, just as popular in the Philippines, have not resulted in murder. 

Butch Albarracin, the owner of "Center for Pop", a Manila-based singing school, also believes the lyrics of "My Way" increase the violence. The lyrics, as he explained, "evoke feelings of pride and arrogance in the singer, as if you're somebody when you're really nobody. It covers up your failures. That's why it leads to fights."

"Karaoke rage" in other countries
Cases of singers being harassed, assaulted or killed mid-performance have been reported all over East and Southeast Asia. Incidents of "karaoke rage" outside of Asia have also been documented. 

In August 2007, a karaoke singer in Seattle, Washington was attacked by a woman who wanted him to stop singing Coldplay's "Yellow".

In March 2008, a man was arrested in Thailand for shooting eight people to death, including his brother-in-law, in a dispute stemming from several karaoke offerings, including repeated renditions of John Denver's "Take Me Home, Country Roads".

In December 2008, a man at a Malaysian coffee shop hogged the karaoke microphone so long he was stabbed to death by other patrons.

In August 2012, a fight over the microphone broke out in a Chinese karaoke parlor, with a man killing two relatives with a meat cleaver.

In July 2013, an American was stabbed to death for refusing to stop singing in a karaoke bar in Krabi, Thailand.

In March 2022, American actor Ezra Miller was arrested and charged with disorderly conduct and harassment after getting into altercations with attendees of a karaoke bar in Hawaii. Miller was at a karaoke bar when they suddenly began “yelling obscenities and became agitated when people began singing karaoke.” Miller allegedly lunged at a man who was playing darts and grabbed a microphone out of a woman’s hand as she was mid-song.

References 

Murder in the Philippines
Deaths in the Philippines
Frank Sinatra
Karaoke
Curses
Controversies in the Philippines
1990s murders in the Philippines
2000s murders in the Philippines
2010s murders in the Philippines